Hinchliffe is an English surname deriving from the place called Hinchcliff, near Holmfirth, in West Yorkshire. Notable people with the surname include:

Ben Hinchliffe (born 1988), English footballer
Brett Hinchliffe (born 1974), American baseball player
Craig Hinchliffe (born 1972), Scottish footballer
David Hinchliffe (born 1948), British politician
Dickon Hinchliffe, British musician and composer
Ian Hinchliffe (born 1952), British physicist
John Hinchliffe (1731–1794), English churchman and college fellow
Stephen Hinchliffe (born 1950), English businessman
Stirling Hinchliffe (born 1970), Australian politician
Walter G. R. Hinchliffe (1894–1928), British aviator and World War I flying ace

See also
Hinchliffe Stadium, a sports venue in Paterson, New Jersey, United States
Hinchliffe Brewing, a pre-Prohibition brewery in Paterson, New Jersey
Hinchcliffe

References